La Ruche ("the beehive") was an artist's residence in the Montparnasse district of Paris. It now hosts around fifty artists and stages art exhibitions open to the public.

History
Located in the Passage Dantzig, in the 15th arrondissement of Paris, La Ruche is an old three-storey circular structure that got its name because it looked more like a large beehive than a dwelling for humans. Originally a temporary building designed by Gustave Eiffel for use as a wine rotunda at the Great Exposition of 1900, the structure was dismantled and re-erected as low-cost studios for artists by Alfred Boucher (1850–1934), a sculptor, who wanted to help young artists by providing them with shared models and an exhibition space open to all residents. As well as to artists, La Ruche became a home to an array of drunks, misfits, drifters and people that just needed a place to stay.

At La Ruche the rent was cheap; and no one was evicted for non-payment. When hungry, many would wander over to artist Marie Vassilieff's soup kitchen (more genteelly called her cantine) for a meal and conversation with fellow starving artists. The Russian painter Pinchus Kremegne got off the train at the Gare de l'Est with three rubles in his pocket. The only words in French he knew was the phrase "Passage Dantzig"; but that was all he needed to get him there.

Artists
Like Montmartre, few places have ever housed such artistic talent as found at La Ruche. At one time or another in those early years of the 20th century, Guillaume Apollinaire, Alexander Archipenko, Joseph Csaky, Gustave Miklos, Ossip Zadkine, Moise Kisling, Marc Chagall, Max Pechstein, Nina Hamnett, Fernand Léger, Jacques Lipchitz, Pinchus Kremegne, Max Jacob, Blaise Cendrars, Chaïm Soutine, Robert Delaunay, Amedeo Modigliani, Constantin Brâncuși, Micheal Farrell, Amshey Nurenberg, Diego Rivera, Marevna, Luigi Guardigli, Miklos Bokor, Michel Sima, Marek Szwarc, José Balmes, Gracia Barrios, Wacław Zawadowski, Kazimierz Brandel, and others, called the place home or frequented it. Today, works by some of these poorer residents and their close friends sell well, even in the millions of dollars.

La Ruche went into decline during World War II; and by the time of the 1968 real estate boom, it was threatened with demolition by developers. However, with the support of well known artists such as Jean-Paul Sartre, Alexander Calder, Jean Renoir, and René Char, new management with a preservation mission took over in 1971, and turned it into a collection of working studios.

Its interior is not open to the general public, although many feel that the exterior of La Ruche alone is worth a visit.

See also
Le Bateau-Lavoir, in Montmartre, Paris.

References

External links

"Another Wild-Goose Chase – No Sign of the 'Beehive'" (Travel diary with photographs)
Guillaume, "Françoise and Modigliani at La Ruche – Adventures In Montparnasse" (Travel diary with photographs)

French artist groups and collectives
Buildings and structures in the 15th arrondissement of Paris
Art Nouveau architecture in Paris
Painting in Paris
World's fair architecture in Paris
Artists' studios in Paris